CYP6M2 is a gene location in Anopheles gambiae chromosome 3R, involved in the insecticide resistant. The enzyme encoded by this gene is capable of directly metabolizing pyrethroids, belongs to the cytochrome P450 family CYP6

References

External links 

6
EC 1.14